Things to Come is a 2016 French-German drama film written and directed by Mia Hansen-Løve. It stars Isabelle Huppert as middle-aged philosophy professor Nathalie Chazeaux, whose life is going through a series of separations.

Things to Come received critical acclaim and was selected to compete for the Golden Bear at the 66th Berlin International Film Festival. At Berlin, Hansen-Løve won the Silver Bear for Best Director. Huppert won several nominations and awards for her performance in the film, including the National Society of Film Critics Award for Best Actress, New York Film Critics Circle Award for Best Actress, Los Angeles Film Critics Association Award for Best Actress, and the London Film Critics' Circle Award for Actress of the Year.

Plot
Nathalie teaches philosophy in a Parisian high school, but for her it is not just a job, it is a way of living and thinking. With a past permeated by youthful idealism, she now aims to teach students to think for themselves, using philosophical texts that stimulate confrontation and discussion. Her life flows between her work, her husband, her two children, and her ex-model mother who needs constant attention. But suddenly everything changes: her husband leaves her, her mother dies and Nathalie finds herself with unexpected and unusual freedom.

Cast
 Isabelle Huppert as Nathalie Chazeaux
 André Marcon as Heinz
 Roman Kolinka as Fabien
 Édith Scob as Yvette Lavastre
 Sarah Le Picard as Chloé
 Solal Forte as Johann
 Élise Lhomeau as Elsa
 Lionel Dray as Hugo
 Grégoire Montana-Haroche as Simon
 Lina Benzerti as Antonia

Production
Hansen-Løve said she wrote the role of Nathalie with Isabelle Huppert in mind. She also said Nathalie was loosely based on her mother, who was a philosophy professor and separated from her husband later in life. Principal photography began on 22 June 2015 in Paris.

Reception

Critical response
Things to Come received critical acclaim. Review aggregation website Rotten Tomatoes gives the film a 99%, based on 143 reviews, with an average score of 8.2/10. The website's critical consensus reads: "A union to cherish between a writer-director and star working at peak power, Things to Come offers quietly profound observations on life, love, and the irrevocable passage of time." At Metacritic, the film received an weighted average score of 88 out of 100, based on 28 reviews from mainstream critics, indicating "universal acclaim".

Box office

Things to Come grossed $5.6 million at the box office.

Accolades

See also
List of Isabelle Huppert performances

Notes

References

External links
 

2016 drama films
2016 films
Films directed by Mia Hansen-Løve
French drama films
2010s French-language films
German drama films
Films about educators
Films about philosophers
2010s French films
2010s German films